The Man in the White Suit is a play by Sean Foley, based on the 1951 Ealing film by Alexander Mackendrick, John Dighton and Roger MacDougall.

Production 
The play will made its world premiere at the Theatre Royal, Bath from 6 to 21 September 2019 before transferring to the Wyndham's Theatre in London's West End beginning previews from 25 September, official opening night on 8 October 2019. It was be directed by Foley, designed by Michael Taylor with music by Noah and the Whale's Charlie Fink and starred Stephen Mangan as Sidney Stratton, Kara Tointon as Daphne Birnley and Sue Johnston as Mrs Watson.

The production was due to run until 11 January 2020, however due to poor ticket sales it closed early on 7 December 2019.

Cast and characters

External links 

 Theatre Royal Bath website
 Delfont Mackintosh website

References 

2019 plays
Comedy plays
Plays based on films
West End plays